Tunde is a unisex name, originally a diminutive form of a Yoruba name for a native of Nigeria which also means "returns". Hence, when Tunde is combined with other Yoruba words such as Baba (father) or Yeye/Iya/Mama (mother) to form Babatunde and Yetunde respectively, the meaning becomes 'father or mother has returned'. Similarly, Omo (son) or Ola (wealth) can be added to Tunde.

Notable persons with the name Tunde include:

Tunde Adebimpe (born 1975), American actor, director and musician
Tunde Adisa, Nigerian para table tennis player
Tunde Baiyewu (born 1965), British-Nigerian singer
Tunde Idiagbon (1942–1999), Nigerian soldier
Tunde Jegede (born 1972), Nigerian composer and musician
Tunde Nightingale (1922–1981), Nigerian musician

See also
Babatunde
Yetunde
Tünde, Hungarian female given name

External links 
 Tunde on YorubaName.com

Unisex given names
Yoruba given names